This is a list of schools in Bracknell Forest, in the English county of Berkshire.

State-funded schools

Primary schools

Ascot Heath Primary School, Ascot
Binfield CE Primary School, Binfield
Birch Hill Primary School, Bracknell
College Town Primary School, College Town
Cranbourne Primary School, Cranbourne
Crown Wood Primary School, Crown Wood
Crowthorne CE Primary School, Crowthorne
Fox Hill Primary School, Bracknell
Great Hollands Primary School, Great Hollands
Harmans Water Primary School, Harmans Water
Holly Spring Primary School, Bracknell
Jennett’s Park CE Primary School, Bracknell
King's Academy Binfield
King's Academy Oakwood, Binfield
Meadow Vale Primary School, Bracknell
New Scotland Hill Primary School, Sandhurst
Owlsmoor Primary School, Owlsmoor
The Pines Primary School, Hanworth
St Joseph's RC Primary School, Bracknell
St Margaret Clitherow RC Primary School, Hanworth
St Michael's CE Primary School, Sandhurst
St Michael's Easthampstead CE Primary School, Easthampstead
Sandy Lane Primary School, Bracknell
Uplands Primary School, Sandhurst
Warfield CE Primary School, Warfield
Whitegrove Primary School, Warfield
Wildmoor Heath School, Crowthorne
Wildridings Primary School, Bracknell
Winkfield St Mary's CE Primary School, Bracknell
Wooden Hill Primary School, Bracknell

Secondary schools
The Brakenhale School, Bracknell
Edgbarrow School, Crowthorne
Garth Hill College, Bracknell
King's Academy Binfield
King's Academy Easthampstead Park, Bracknell
Ranelagh School, Bracknell
Sandhurst School, Owlsmoor

Special and alternative schools
College Hall, Bracknell
Kennel Lane School, Bracknell

Further education
Bracknell and Wokingham College

Independent schools

Primary and preparatory schools
Eagle House School, Sandhurst
Lambrook, Bracknell
Meadowbrook Montessori School, Warfield
Newbold School, Binfield

Senior and all-through schools
Heathfield School, Ascot
Licensed Victuallers' School, Ascot
Wellington College, Crowthorne

Special and alternative schools
Cressex Lodge School, Binfield

Bracknell Forest
Schools in Bracknell Forest
School